Bellingham is the most populous city in, and county seat of Whatcom County in the U.S. state of Washington. The city had a population of 91,482 as of the 2020 census.

The city of Bellingham, incorporated in 1903, consolidated four settlements: Bellingham, Whatcom, Fairhaven, and Sehome. It takes its name from Bellingham Bay, named by George Vancouver in 1792, for Sir William Bellingham, the Controller of Storekeeper Accounts of the Royal Navy during the Vancouver Expedition.

Today, Bellingham is the northernmost city with a population of more than 90,000 people in the contiguous United States. It is a popular tourist destination known for its easy access to outdoor recreation in the San Juan Islands and North Cascades.

History

Bellingham is the homeland of Coast Salish peoples of the Lummi (or Lhaq'temish) People and neighboring tribes. People of Lummi ancestry continue to live in and around Bellingham Bay, particularly on the nearby Lummi Nation reservation.

The first European immigrants reached the area about 1852 when Henry Roeder and Russel Peabody set up a lumber mill at Whatcom, now the northern part of Bellingham. Lumber cutting and milling continues to the present in Whatcom county. At about the same time, Dan Harris arrived, claiming a homestead along Padden Creek, and after acquiring surrounding properties, platted the town of Fairhaven in 1883. In 1858, the Fraser Canyon Gold Rush caused a short lived population growth that established the community.

Coal was mined in the Bellingham Bay area from the mid-19th to the mid-20th centuries starting when Henry Roeder's agents discovered coal south of Whatcom Creek, in an area called Sehome, now downtown Bellingham, in 1854. They sold the coal-bearing land to San Francisco investors who established the Bellingham Bay Coal Company, eventually a subsidiary of the Black Diamond Coal Mining Company. After a hundred years of extensive mining beneath present-day Bellingham, the last mine closed in 1955.

In the early 1890s, three railroad lines arrived, connecting the bay cities to a nationwide market of builders. In 1889, Pierre Cornwall and an association of investors formed the Bellingham Bay Improvement Company (BBIC). The BBIC invested in several diverse enterprises such as shipping, coal, mining, railroad construction, real estate sales and utilities. Even though their dreams of turning the cities by the bay into a Pacific Northwest metropolis never came to fruition, the BBIC made an immense contribution to the economic development of Bellingham.

BBIC was not the only outside firm with an interest in the bay area utilities. The General Electric Company of New York purchased the Fairhaven Line and New Whatcom street rail line in 1897. In 1898, the utility merged into the Northern Railway and Improvement Company which prompted the Electric Corporation of Boston to purchase a large block of shares.

In 1890, Fairhaven developers bought the tiny community of Bellingham. Whatcom and Sehome merged in 1891 to form New Whatcom (1903 act of the State legislature dropped "New" from the name.) At first, attempts to combine Fairhaven and Whatcom failed, and there was controversy over the name of the proposed new city. Whatcom citizens would not support a city named Fairhaven, and Fairhaven residents would not support a city named Whatcom. They eventually settled on the name Bellingham, which remains today. Voting a second time for a final merger of Fairhaven and Whatcom into a single city, the resolution passed with 2163 votes for and 596 against.

Bellingham was officially incorporated on December 28, 1903, as a result of the incremental consolidation of the four towns initially situated on the east of Bellingham Bay during the final decade of the 19th Century. Whatcom is today's "Old Town" area and was founded with Roeder's Mill in 1852. Sehome was an area of downtown founded with the Sehome Coal Mine in 1854. Bellingham was further south near Boulevard Park, founded in 1883 and purchased in 1890 by Fairhaven. Fairhaven was a large commercial district with its own harbor, founded in 1883, by Dan Harris, around his initial homestead on Padden Creek.

Bellingham was the site of the Bellingham riots against East Indian (Sikh) immigrant workers in 1907. A mob of 400–500 white men, predominantly members of the Asiatic Exclusion League, with intentions to exclude East Indian immigrants from the work force of the local lumber mills, attacked the homes of the South Asian Indians. The Indians were mostly Sikhs but were labeled as Hindus by much of the media of the day.

Bellingham's proximity to the Strait of Juan de Fuca and to the Inside Passage to Alaska helped to retain some cannery operations. Pacific American Fisheries (P.A.F.), for example, shipped empty cans to Alaska, where they were packed with fish and shipped back.

Geography
The city is situated on Bellingham Bay which is protected by Lummi Island, Portage Island, and the Lummi Peninsula, and opens onto the Strait of Georgia. It lies west of Mount Baker and Lake Whatcom (from which it gets its drinking water) and north of the Chuckanut Mountains and the Skagit Valley. Whatcom Creek runs through the center of the city.

The lowest elevations are at sea level along the waterfront. South and eastward of the city limits are taller foothills of the North Cascades mountains. Mount Baker is the largest peak in the local area, with a summit elevation of  that is only  from Bellingham Bay. Mount Baker is visible from many parts of the city and western Whatcom County. Lake Whatcom forms part of the eastern boundary of the city, while many smaller lakes and wetland areas are found around the region.

Situated at a latitude of 48.75 North, and thus north of the 48°34' parallel, Bellingham is one of only a few cities in the continental United States that experience astronomical twilight for the entire night. The phenomenon occurs every year between June 14 and June 28.

Bellingham's neighborhoods are Alabama Hill, Barkley, Birchwood, Columbia, Cordata, Cornwall Park, Downtown Central Business District, Edgemoor, Fairhaven, Happy Valley, Irongate, King Mountain, Lettered Streets, Meridian, Puget, Roosevelt, Samish, Sehome, Silver Beach, South, South Hill, Sunnyland, Whatcom Falls, Western Washington University (WWU) (including the campus), and York.

Climate

Bellingham's climate is generally mild and typical of the Puget Sound region. Western Whatcom County has a marine oceanic climate that is strongly influenced by the Cascade Range and Olympic Mountains. The Cascades to the east retain the temperate marine influence, while the Olympics provide a rain shadow effect that buffers Bellingham from much of the rainfall approaching from the southwest.

As evident in the table below, November is typically the wettest month, with numerous frontal rainstorms arriving. Still, precipitation is distributed throughout the rainy period extending from October through April.

Bellingham was reported to have the lowest average sunshine amount of any city in the US. Despite this, Bellingham also has mild, pleasant summers and confirmed scientific climate data indicates it is actually less cloudy on average than Seattle (SeaTac), Everett (Paine Field) and Olympia. This is markedly cooler than the record high for Seattle and most other Washington locations. Drought is rare, although some summers are noticeably drier than others and some normally reliable wells have been known to run dry in August and September. Nevertheless, crops are more frequently ruined by too much rain rather than too little.

Bellingham's proximity to the Fraser River valley occasionally subjects it to a harsh winter weather pattern (termed a 'north-Easter') wherein an upper-level trough drives cold Arctic air from the Canadian interior southwesterly through the Fraser River Canyon. Wind chill equivalents reached  according to NOAA. Several days into this pattern, local ponds and smaller lakes freeze solidly enough to allow skating. Outflow winds can collide with a Gulf of Alaska moisture and create ice, snow, or heavy rains. This transition can also lead to freezing rain, referred to as a "silver thaw" that produces hazardous roads among other inconveniences.

Its reverse, the "Pineapple Express", refers to acutely mild autumn and winter spells – for most of such a spell, an unusually warm and steady wind comes out of the south. It will typically follow several days of Arctic northeast outflow winds, and it can melt significant snow accumulations quickly, pushing drainage systems to their limits.

Demographics

As of 2000, the median income for a household in the city was $32,530, and the median income for a family was $47,196. Males had a median income of $35,288 versus $25,971 for females. The per capita income for the city was $19,483. About 9.4% of families and 20.6% of the population were below the poverty line, including 17.2% of those under age 18 and 9.0% of those aged 65 or over.

2010 census
As of the census of 2010, there were 80,885 people, 34,671 households, and 16,129 families residing in the city. The racial makeup of the city was 84.9% White, 1.3% African American, 1.3% Native American, 5.1% Asian, 0.3% Pacific Islander, 2.8% from other races, and 4.3% from two or more races. Hispanic or Latino of any race were 7.0% of the population.

There were 34,671 households, of which 21.1% had children under the age of 18 living with them, 34.2% were married couples living together, 8.9% had a female householder with no husband present, 3.5% had a male householder with no wife present, and 53.5% were non-families. 35.3% of all households were made up of individuals, and 10.8% had someone living alone who was 65 years of age or older. The average household size was 2.18 and the average family size was 2.79.

The median age in the city was 31.3 years. 15.6% of residents were under the age of 18; 23.5% were between the ages of 18 and 24; 25.9% were from 25 to 44; 22% were from 45 to 64; and 12.8% were 65 years of age or older. The gender makeup of the city was 48.8% male and 51.2% female.

Economy

The mean annual salary of a wage earner in Bellingham is $49,363, which is below the Washington State average of $66,870.

In the first quarter of 2017, Bellingham's median home sale was $382,763, compared to the Whatcom County median of $322,779. Strong job and income growth, along with low inventory of homes for sale, have contributed to a median monthly rental payment in February 2017 of $1,526.

Largest employers

According to Bellingham's 2017 Comprehensive Annual Financial Report, the largest employers in Bellingham are:

Arts and culture

Events
 The Ski to Sea race is a team relay race made up of seven legs: cross country skiing, downhill skiing (or snowboarding), running, road biking, canoeing (2 person), mountain biking, and kayaking. The racers begin at the Mount Baker Ski Area and make their way down to the finish line on Bellingham Bay. Organized by the Bellingham/Whatcom Chamber of Commerce & Industry, the event was first held in 1973 and traces it roots to the 1911 Mt. Baker Marathon.
 The Bellingham Bay Marathon, Half Marathon, 10K & 5K is held annually on the last Sunday in September, attracting approximately 2,500 runners and walkers each year. The Boston-qualifier marathon starts near Gooseberry Point on Lummi Nation and circumnavigates Bellingham Bay to finish in downtown Bellingham. The half marathon, 10K, and 5K races all start and end at Depot Market Square.
The Whatcom Artist Studio Tour is an annual event featuring local artists working in a variety of media. On the first two weekends in October, artists open their studios up to the public.
The Bellingham Highland Games & Scottish Festival is held every year at Ferndale's Hovander Park the first full weekend in June. The outdoor event celebrates Scottish culture and heritage, with two days of games, spectator sports, dancing, music and food.
LinuxFest Northwest is a free conference dedicated to discussion and development of the Linux operating system and other open-source and free-software projects. It is a weekend event held at Bellingham Technical College in late April or early May which draws more than a thousand enthusiasts.
The annual International Day of Peace is celebrated in Bellingham on September 21. The holiday was instituted by the United Nations as a 24-hour global cease-fire. The Bellingham-based Whatcom Peace & Justice Center publishes a calendar of upcoming activist events with a theme of non-violence, community dissent, and worldwide peace.
The Bellingham Festival of Music is an annual celebration of orchestral and chamber concerts, held in July, hosting musicians from North American orchestral ensembles.
Bellingham Pride is a gay pride parade and festival held in July each year to celebrate LGBT people and history. The parade passes through the downtown and ends in the public market area.

Beer
Craft beer is a major emerging industry in Bellingham. There are now 14 breweries within Bellingham city limits and three additional breweries in Whatcom County. In 2018, these breweries combined won 46 medals at seven national and international brewery competitions.

Downtown
The Bellingham Farmers Market is open on Saturdays from early April to late December. Originally opened in 1993, the Farmers Market now features more than 50 vendors, music and community events. The association also operates a weekly Wednesday market in nearby Fairhaven.

Wednesday nights in the summer see Downtown Sounds, a family-friendly concert series featuring food booths and a beer garden with local breweries held on Bay Street.

From May to September, the Downtown Bellingham Partnership runs the Commercial Street Night Market, with local food, artisan vendors, live music and performances.

Local attractions

The Whatcom Museum of History and Art sponsors exhibits of painting, sculpture, local history, and is an active participant in the city's monthly Gallery Walks which are pedestrian tours of the historic buildings of the city, offering history and art lessons for local schools and adult groups, and historic cruises on Bellingham Bay.

The Bellingham Railway Museum has educational displays on the history of railroading in Whatcom County, as well as model trains and a freight-train simulator.

The SPARK Museum of Electrical Invention, formerly known as the American Museum of Radio and Electricity, has a collection of rare artifacts from 1580 into the 1950s, providing educational resources about the history of electronics and radio broadcasting. The AMRE also operates KMRE-LP 102.3 FM, a low-power FM radio station which broadcasts a number of old shows popular many decades ago, as well as programming of general interest to the community.

Mindport is a privately funded arts and science museum.

Whatcom Falls Park is a large public park encompassing the Whatcom Creek gorge, running directly through the heart of the city. It has four sets of waterfalls and several miles of walking trails. Popular activities during warmer weather include swimming, fishing, and strolling along the numerous walking trails. On 10 June 1999, the Olympic pipeline explosion occurred in Whatcom Falls Park, killing three boys who were playing in the vicinity. Operated by Olympic Pipe Line Company, the gas line that crossed Whatcom and Hanna Creeks leaked highly flammable material that turned the creeks pink, and then exploded into flames.

During most years the depth of accumulated snow exceeds .

South of the city of Bellingham Chuckanut Drive (Washington State Route 11) has cliffside views of the sea, the San Juan Islands and the Olympic Mountains, the hills and forests of the Chuckanut mountains, and several small bays along the edge of the Salish Sea.

Several miles from Bellingham in the southern part of Whatcom County there are many places for outdoor recreation, including Larrabee State Park (popular for hiking), Lake Padden (popular for swimming, fishing and golfing), and Lake Samish.

To the east of the city lies Lake Whatcom, which provides the local public water supply and is the source of Whatcom Creek.

Between Lake Whatcom and Lake Padden is North Lookout Mountain, known locally as Galbraith Mountain, with many mountain bike trails.

In the waters of the Georgia Strait and Puget Sound it is possible to go whale watching to see several pods of orcas (killer whales).

Bellis Fair Mall, the city's main shopping mall, opened in 1988.

Music scene
Bellingham's location between two major cities, universities, record labels, and music magazines have all contributed to making Bellingham a desirable and recognized local music scene. The presence of a large university-age population has helped Bellingham become home to a number of regionally and nationally noted musical acts such as Death Cab for Cutie, Odesza, The Posies, Crayon, Idiot Pilot, Mono Men, No-Fi Soul Rebellion, Sculptured, Federation X, The Trucks, Black Eyes & Neckties, Black Breath, The High Mountain String Band, Shimmertraps, Dizzy Spins, and Shook Ones. Local independent record labels include Estrus Records and Clickpop Records. The city was also home to What's Up! Magazine which covered the local music scene for 22 years ending in March 2020, and Lemonade Magazine, devoted to music and entertainment of all kinds.

Bellingham is also the home of an active classical music scene which includes the Bellingham Symphony Orchestra (formerly the Whatcom Symphony Orchestra), North Sound Youth Symphony, numerous community music groups and choirs, and the internationally recognized Bellingham Festival of Music.

Literary scene
Bellingham is home to an active writers community at the local universities and independent of them. Western Washington University's English Department publishes the Bellingham Review. In 2011, the city hosted the first annual Chuckanut Writers Conference, run by Whatcom Community College and Village Books, a local bookstore. Clover, A Literary Rag, a publication of the Independent Writers' Studio, has produced 9 volumes since 2010. The city is home to writers including Steve Martini and George Dyson. Bellingham Public Library provides free library services at the Central Library, Barkley Branch and Fairhaven Branch.

Local theater

Bellingham's theater culture is boosted by the performing arts department at Western Washington University. There are several theaters and productions in Bellingham:
 Bellingham Theatre Guild – This non-profit community theater was founded in 1929. Hilary Swank performed here before moving to LA to pursue her career in acting.
 Historic Mount Baker Theatre – The Mount Baker Theater is the largest performing arts facility north of Seattle and is listed on the register of National Historic Places. The theater is an example of Moorish architecture, with several sections of the 1927 theater having been restored over the past two decades.
 Upfront Theatre, an improv comedy venue established by Bellingham resident Ryan Stiles of Whose Line Is It Anyway? fame.
 Northwest Ballet, a regional ballet company, performs classical ballets
 iDiOM Theater — Non-profit regional theater, and almost every show is new, locally written work.
 Firehouse Performing Arts Center, a Fairhaven firehouse converted into a dance classroom and theater

Activism
The Whatcom Peace & Justice Center was founded in 2002 by local activists, and has been one of the most active such centers in the nation.

In October 2006, the Bellingham City Council passed a Troops Home! resolution, making Bellingham the first city in the state of Washington to pass the resolution. Two years later, the City Council passed a resolution urging elected representatives and the federal government to avoid war with Iran, becoming the first city in the state to do so. In 2012, the City Council unanimously passed a resolution calling upon the federal government to overturn the Supreme Court's decision in the case of FEC v. Citizens United by declaring that U.S. Constitutional rights apply to natural persons and not to corporations. In 2014, coinciding with Columbus Day that celebrates the arrival of European explorers, the City Council officially established Coast Salish Day to celebrate the Native American peoples who continue to call the geographic region their home.

In 2015, the Seattle Arctic drilling protests spread to Bellingham when a protester chained herself to the anchor chain of a Royal Dutch Shell ship for 63 hours.

Future development

Bellingham is frequently named on Best Places to Retire lists; 2008-2013 population growth in the 55+ year old segment outpaced overall population growth, at 3.7% to 0.8% annually. However, the high cost of housing has also caused it to be listed among America's Worst Cities as well. (In 2016, Washington State scored the fastest growing housing prices in the country.)

Bellingham saw apartment vacancy hit 0.6% in 2016, and plans to use multi-family housing to accommodate more than 50% of the projected growth in housing units (16,525 units by 2036). According to Aaron Terrazas, senior economist at Zillow, "Given the area's pace of growth, it would require very aggressive building to keep rent affordability in check."

The city has resisted expanding the Urban Growth Area for many years, and hopes to fit both multi-family and single-family growth within the city limits. Builders counter that even City planners acknowledge that the city is "largely built out" and that the remaining land is difficult or expensive to build on. Attempts to increase density, ease restrictions on 'accessory dwelling units', or even to develop land already zoned residential, are regularly met with fierce neighborhood opposition: Padden Trails was opposed by the Samish Neighborhood Association; a dense development at the Sunnyland D.O.T. site was scaled-down; Fairhaven neighbors led the effort to prevent the development of Fairhaven Highlands, (now Chuckanut Ridge), which the City ended up purchasing for $8.2 million, preventing more than 700 new housing units; neighborhood groups pressured the City Council to go against staff recommendation to rezone Squalicum Lofts for residential development.

In 2017, the Bellingham City Council began acknowledging housing affordability as a critical issue, and hosted a town hall meeting on housing affordability and homelessness.

Waterfront redevelopment

The Bellingham waterfront has served as an industrial center for more than a century, starting with the arrival of Henry Roeder and Russell Peabody in the mid-1800s.

Georgia-Pacific (G-P) purchased the Puget Sound Pulp and Timber Company in 1963 and operated a pulp mill on the central downtown waterfront until 2001. In 1965, G-P built a chlor-alkali facility, which became a source of mercury contamination in the Whatcom Waterway and on the uplands of the site for decades. The documentary film, "Smells Like Money – The Story of Bellingham's Georgia Pacific Plant" tells the story of the site, which has since been purchased by the Port of Bellingham chiefly to create a marina in the  wastewater lagoon. The Port of Bellingham purchased the G-P site for $10 with the understanding that the port would assume liability for the contamination. The City of Bellingham and the Port of Bellingham entered into several interlocal agreements in which the City agreed to pay for all infrastructure costs, and the Port would create a marina, clean up the site, and retain all zoning.

The cleanup site (approximately ) was divided into two areas: pulp and tissue mill area and the chlor-alkali area. Contaminated soils and building materials were removed in 2011 and 2013; the Department of Ecology finalized the Interim Cleanup Work Plan in January 2017, and that work was completed in April 2017 when 31 acres were capped with a protective barrier. Work continues on evaluating cleanup alternatives for the entire chlor-alkali area of the site.

The City and Port have entered into a partnership to redevelop the property, and in 2013 contracted with Harcourt Developments to develop . The Granary Building remodel will be completed in 2017; Harcourt has submitted plans for two waterfront condo buildings in 2018 and 2019; the city will be constructing two main roads through the side in 2017.

Sports

The people of Bellingham pursue a diverse range of amateur sports, with skiing and snowboarding at the Mount Baker Ski Area popular in the winter and kayaking and cycling in the summer. Mt. Baker claims a world record for seasonal snowfall, with  recorded in the 1998–1999 season.

Western Washington University is home to NCAA Division II National Women's Rowing Champions. The Lady Vikings became Western's very first NCAA champion team in 2005 and won again in 2006, 2007, 2008, 2009, and 2011. The 2011-2012 Western Men's Basketball team won the NCAA Division II National Championship. In 2016, the nationally ranked Western Women's Soccer Team won the NCAA Division II National Championship.

Western Washington University also operates a collegiate road cycling program that took top-5 positions nationwide at the 2006 nationals.

Future Hall of Famer Ken Griffey Jr. began his professional career with the short-season class A Bellingham Mariners of the Northwest League in 1987.

Government
The City of Bellingham has a non-partisan strong-mayor, weak-council form of government. The directly elected mayor serves a four-year term. Six of the seven city council members are elected by ward for staggered four-year terms. The seventh council member is elected at-large every two years.

A municipal court judge is also elected for four-year terms.

The city maintains Bellingham Police Department and fire department and operates the countywide Medic One medical emergency response service through an agreement with Whatcom County. According to Uniform Crime Report statistics compiled by the Federal Bureau of Investigation (FBI) in 2010, there were 282 violent crimes and 3,653 property crimes per 100,000 residents. Of these, the violent crimes consisted of 37 forcible rapes, 73 robberies and 170 aggravated assaults, while 589 burglaries, 2,931 larceny-thefts, 133 motor vehicle thefts and six arson defined the property offenses.

Education

Bellingham School District is the local school district. There are four public high schools in Bellingham: Bellingham High School, Options High School, Sehome High School, and Squalicum High School. Bellingham has four public middle schools: Kulshan Middle School, Shuksan Middle School, Fairhaven Middle School, and Whatcom Middle School which was recently rebuilt after extensive fire damage in 2009.

Private schools in Bellingham include Whatcom Hills Waldorf School (Prekindergarten through 8th grade), Whatcom Day Academy (Prekindergarten to 8th grade), St. Paul's Academy (Prekindergarten to 12th grade), Assumption Catholic School (Kindergarten to 9th grade), and The Franklin Academy (Preschool to 8th grade).  Western Washington University is located in Bellingham. It has more than 16,000 students. The Northwest Film School is a private, non-profit educational institution specializing in digital media production. It operates in a partnership with Western Washington University to offer a one-year certificate in Video Production.

Bellingham has two community colleges:
Whatcom Community College
Bellingham Technical College

For-profit schools include Charter College, Lean Leadership Institute, Washington Engineering Institute and Washington Technology Institute.

Lummi Nation School has a Bellingham postal address but it is away from the city limits in an unincorporated area on the Lummi reservation.

Media

Newspapers
The Bellingham Herald is published daily in Bellingham. Other newspapers include Cascadia Weekly (until 2021), The Front, and The Bellingham Business Journal (until 2020). Cascadia Daily News debuted on January 24, 2022 as a daily online publication and weekly print publication, replacing Cascadia Weekly.

Television
Bellingham and Whatcom County are part of the Seattle television market. The area has had exceptionally early and strong penetration of cable television since the 1950s, and there have never been any local translators of the major Seattle TV stations.

Stations in Vancouver, British Columbia, Canada, can be viewed over the air with a suitable antenna, but those in Seattle are too distant to receive in most locations in the county. Whatcom County residents can also receive CBC and CTV stations via cable service. The KVOS-TV broadcast is available in most parts of Bellingham with an antenna as well.

The City of Bellingham also operates BTV10, a public access channel available on YouTube on Comcast standard definition channel 10.

Magazines
 Bellingham on Tap is a monthly nightlife magazine featuring complete happy hour and bar special listings, reviews, events, local interest articles, and columns including sex advice, rants, and astrology.
 Bellingham Alive Magazine is a bi-monthly lifestyle magazine focusing on life in Whatcom, Skagit, San Juan and Island counties.
 Frequency: The Snowboarder's Journal is an independent snowboarding magazine based in Bellingham, published quarterly.
 What's Up! is a monthly music magazine focused on local music. It covers live shows, band bios and new artist releases.
 Business Pulse has been covering Bellingham and Whatcom County business news and business profiles since 1975.
 Southside Living is mailed directly to residents of Bellingham's Chuckanut Drive, Edgemoor, Fairhaven, and South Hill neighborhoods.

AM radio

FM radio

Infrastructure

Transportation

Bellingham is bisected by Interstate 5 (I-5), which connects it to Seattle, Vancouver, and Portland, Oregon. The city also has three state highways: State Route 11, a scenic byway through the Chuckanut Mountains; State Route 539, which connects to Lynden and the Canadian border; and State Route 542, which travels east to the Mount Baker Ski Area.

The Bellingham International Airport offers scheduled commuter flights to and from Seattle and Friday Harbor, Washington, and regularly scheduled jet service to various West Coast airports via Alaska Airlines, Allegiant Air, and Southwest Airlines. Alaska Airlines and Allegiant Air used to fly to Hawaii from Bellingham, serving Honolulu, Kahului, and Kona at various times, but this service ceased by 2019. The airport is home of the first Air and Marine Operations Center, to assist the US Department of Homeland Security with border surveillance.

The Whatcom Transportation Authority (WTA) is the county's public transit agency and operates fixed bus service within Bellingham and its neighboring cities. The agency has several hubs, including the downtown station, the Western Washington University campus, and Cordata Station near Bellis Fair Mall, which is served by BoltBus intercity express buses to Seattle and Vancouver. Several corridors have frequent service that is branded as "GO Lines", with service every 15 minutes. WTA also offers intercity service to Mount Vernon, connecting with Skagit Transit for onward service to Everett.

The city's main train station, Fairhaven Station, is served by scheduled Amtrak Cascades service to Vancouver and Seattle twice a day. Amtrak also operates one Thruway bus trip to supplement its train service on the corridor. The Bellingham Cruise Terminal is adjacent to the Amtrak station and serves as the southern terminus of the Alaska Marine Highway, a state-run ferry for passengers and vehicles. The ferries provide service to Ketchikan, Juneau, and Haines. The terminal is also served by San Juan Cruises, which provides seasonal passenger ferry service to the San Juan Islands and Friday Harbor.

Notable people

Danny Abramowicz – former NFL wide receiver
Bob Arbogast – radio-television host and voice actor
Jon Auer – vocalist, guitarist, songwriter, founding member of the Posies
Steve Baker – professional motorcycle racer and member of the AMA Motorcycle Hall of Fame
 Carlos Becerra – Carlos from Carspotting on Discovery
Billy Burke – television and film actor, Twilight, Zoo
Misha Collins – actor, Supernatural
Ramsey Denison – documentary filmmaker, editor
J. J. Donovan – Washington state businessman and politician
Ben Gibbard – lead singer for Death Cab for Cutie
Ryan Hietala – professional golfer
Yolanda Hughes-Heying – IFBB professional bodybuilder
Paul Jessup – world record holder for discus; competed in the 1932 Summer Olympics
Oscar Jimenez – soccer player for Louisville City FC
Anna Leader – poet and novelist
Jake Locker – (born in Bellingham), quarterback for University of Washington and NFL's Tennessee Titans
Dana Lyons – folk and alternative rock musician, author, environmentalist
Cuddles Marshall – major league baseball player for the New York Yankees and St. Louis Browns
Philip McCracken – artist, sculptor, activist
Jason McGerr – drummer for Death Cab for Cutie
Finn McKenty - (born in Bellingham) American Internet Personality, Music & Entertainment Journalist, Host of the Punk Rock MBA
Tommy Noonan – Actor. He played a wealthy fiancé of Lorelei Lee (Marilyn Monroe) in Gentlemen Prefer Blondes
Doug Pederson – head coach of the Jacksonville Jaguars of the National Football League
Alfred Pettibone (1835–1914) – Washington state pioneer, one of the first residents of Bellingham
Jeff Ragsdale – author, activist, national game show champion
Taylor Rapp – NFL safety for the Los Angeles Rams
Roger Repoz – major league baseball player
Charles Roehl (1857–1927) – Bellingham pioneer and businessman
William Roehl (1890–1968) – Bellingham pioneer and businessman
Jim Sterk - former athletic director for Missouri
Ryan Stiles – comedian on Whose Line Is It Anyway?, actor on The Drew Carey Show and Two and a Half Men
Ken Stringfellow – vocalist, guitarist, songwriter, founding member of the Posies
Hilary Swank – actress
Al Swift, former member of the United States House of Representatives who resided in Bellingham.
Ben Weber – film and television actor
Christopher Wise – author

Sister cities
Bellingham maintains sister city relationships with five Pacific Rim port cities and Vaasa, Finland.

Tateyama and Port Stephens are also sister cities with each other.

Bellingham Sister Cities Association promotes Bellingham's sister city relationships. The relationship with Tateyama is the most active and includes regular events such as an annual city hall staff exchange and community cultural visits. Tateyama frequently fields a team for the annual Ski to Sea race, or at minimum has representation in the Ski to Sea parade.

See also
 Olympic pipeline explosion

Notes

Further reading

External links

 
Cities in Washington (state)
County seats in Washington (state)
Populated places established in 1854
Cities in Whatcom County, Washington
1854 establishments in Washington Territory